George Peter Klubertanz (1912-5 July 1972) was an American philosopher and Professor of Philosophy at Saint Louis University. He was a president of the Metaphysical Society of America.

Books
 Being and God; an introduction to the philosophy of being and to natural theology (New York, Appleton-Century-Crofts, [1963])
 Introduction to the philosophy of being. (New York : Appleton-Century-Crofts, [1955]) 
 The philosophy of human nature. (New York, Appleton-Century-Crofts, [1953]) 
 St. Thomas Aquinas on analogy : textual analysis and systematic synthesis / (Chicago : Loyola University Press, 1960)

References

20th-century American philosophers
Philosophy academics
1912 births
1972 deaths
Presidents of the Metaphysical Society of America
University of Toronto alumni
Saint Louis University alumni